Joe McLaughlin (born 2 June 1960 in Greenock) is a retired professional footballer who played for Chelsea for six seasons in the 1980s.

Playing career 

McLaughlin started his playing career with Greenock Morton in 1977. During his time at Greenock he became a regular in the Scotland national under-21 football team, winning 10 caps. In 1983, he was transferred to Chelsea for a fee of £100,000. McLaughlin began his career at Chelsea by winning the Second Division championship in his first season. He would go on to play for Chelsea until 1989 winning another Second Division championship as well as the Full Members Cup.

He was then transferred to Charlton Athletic for £650,000 which at that time made him Charlton's record transfer. After one season at Charlton, he was sold to Watford for £500,000. He spent two seasons as Watford captain before returning home to Scotland to play for Falkirk

Injury meant he made only 8 appearances in his first season at Falkirk, the team were relegated from the Premier League. However the following season Joe would captain the team to success by securing the First Division championship. Falkirk almost qualified for Europe the following season and after 4 years at Falkirk, McLaughin was transferred to Hibernian before going on to play for Clydebank and then St Mirren.

Coaching career 

McLaughlin is a UEFA A Licence coach and was part of the coaching staff at St Mirren in 1999 whilst still playing. He moved to Clydebank and was also player/coach. In 2001 McLaughlin moved back to London by accepting a position to work with Mark McGhee at Millwall. The club reached the play-offs in his first season, narrowly losing to Birmingham City who eventually won promotion the Premiership. After leaving Millwall, McLaughlin returned to Greenock Morton to be Head of youth Academy and also had six games as caretaker manager.

Joe currently runs a successful Soccer Scholarship business Soccer Icon USA, a company that specialises in sending top young footballers to play soccer and study at some of the best USA Colleges. As of May 2019, McLaughlin was assistant manager at Albion Rovers and head of scouting in Scotland for Fulham FC.

Honours

Club
Chelsea
Full Members Cup: 1985–86
Football League Second Division: 1983–84, 1988–89

Falkirk
Scottish Challenge Cup: 1993–94
Scottish Football League First Division: 1993–94

St Mirren
Scottish Football League First Division: 1999–2000

References

External links 

www.soccericon.net

1960 births
Living people
Charlton Athletic F.C. players
Chelsea F.C. players
Clydebank F.C. (1965) players
Falkirk F.C. players
Association football defenders
Greenock Morton F.C. non-playing staff
Greenock Morton F.C. players
Hibernian F.C. players
Scottish Football League players
Scottish footballers
St Mirren F.C. players
English Football League players
Watford F.C. players
Bolton Wanderers F.C. non-playing staff
Scotland under-21 international footballers
Footballers from Greenock
St Mirren F.C. non-playing staff
Clydebank F.C. (1965) non-playing staff
Association football coaches
Association football scouts